The Sinclair Wetlands (Te Nohoaka o Tukiauau) are an internationally renowned wetlands located to the south west of Dunedin, New Zealand, at the southern edge of the Taieri Plains. They are on the western side of Lake Waipori and approximately equidistant between Mosgiel and Milton. The protected area covers a little over 315 Ha 3 km2.

The wetlands are home to many species of birds including scaup, swans and many more wetland waterfowl including the fernbird and rare bittern. A number of birds such as white herons and spoonbills occasionally frequent the area also.

The wetlands are named for Horace "Horrie" Sinclair, a local farmer who donated land to the wetlands scheme in 1984. An education centre opened in the late 1980s is located at the wetlands. The wetlands contain a small island (Whakaraupuka / Ram Island), which was in ancient times the location of a Maori settlement, Tukiauau Pa.

In the 1986 New Year Honours, Horace Sinclair was appointed a Member of the Order of the British Empire, for services to conservation.

Gallery

References

 Dann, C., & Peat, N. (1989).  Dunedin, North and South Otago. Wellington: GP Books.

External links 
 https://www.tenohoaka.org.nz/ Te Nohoaka o Tukiauau/ Sinclair Wetlands

Protected areas of Otago
Wetlands of Otago
Taieri River